Jussi Oksanen (born 9 May 1979) is a Finnish former snowboarder. He competed in the men's halfpipe event at the 1998 Winter Olympics.

References

External links
 

1979 births
Living people
Finnish male snowboarders
Olympic snowboarders of Finland
Snowboarders at the 1998 Winter Olympics
People from Kirkkonummi
Sportspeople from Uusimaa